is a Shinto shrine in Matsue, Shimane Prefecture, Japan. The Taisha-zukuri Honden of 1813 is an Important Cultural Property. A collection of 846 musical instruments dedicated to the shrine, and two dugout-canoes used in the Morotabune rite have been designated as Important Tangible Folk Cultural Property.

See also
 Important Tangible Folk Cultural Properties
 Modern system of ranked Shinto Shrines
 Yaegaki Jinja
 Kamosu Jinja
 Sada Jinja
 Izumo Taisha
Beppyo shrines

References

Shinto shrines in Shimane Prefecture
Important Cultural Properties of Japan